Giovanni Gallavotti is an Italian mathematical physicist, born in Naples on 29 December 1941.

He is the recipient of the "Premio Nazionale Presidente della Repubblica", presso la Classe di Scienze Naturali dell'Accademia Nazionale dei Lincei, 18 June 1997, and the Boltzmann Medal awarded by IUPAP- International Union of Pure and Applied Physics), 11 July 2007, with the citation:

He was an Invited Speaker with talk Renormalization theory and group in mathematical physics at the International Congress of Mathematicians (ICM) in 1986 in Berkeley and a Plenary Speaker at the ICM in 1998 in Berlin.

On 2018 he was awarded with the Henri Poincaré Prize "for his outstanding contributions to equilibrium and non-equilibrium statistical mechanics, quantum field theory, classical mechanics, and chaotic systems, including, in particular, the renormalization theory for interacting fermionic systems and the fluctuation relation for the large deviation functional of entropy production."

Selected publications

References

External links
Home page

1941 births
Living people
20th-century Italian physicists
University of Florence alumni
Sapienza University of Rome alumni
Academic staff of the Sapienza University of Rome
Academic staff of the University of Naples Federico II
Academic staff of the University of Florence
Academic staff of the University of Rome Tor Vergata
Presidents of the International Association of Mathematical Physics